Derek Williams (born 11 March 1965 in Stockwell, London) is an English professional heavyweight boxer of the 1980s and '90s who won the British Boxing Board of Control (BBBofC) British heavyweight title, Commonwealth heavyweight title, and European Boxing Union (EBU) heavyweight title, his professional fighting weight varied from , to , i.e. heavyweight.

References

External links

1965 births
Heavyweight boxers
English male boxers
People from Stockwell
Boxers from Greater London
Living people